Vysoká is a municipality and village in Mělník District in the Central Bohemian Region of the Czech Republic. It has about 900 inhabitants.

Administrative parts
Villages of Bosyně, Chodeč, Strážnice and Střednice are administrative parts of Vysoká.

References

Villages in Mělník District